The Pharmacy College Admission Test (PCAT) is a computer-based standardized test administered to prospective pharmacy school students by Pearson Education, Inc as a service for the American Association of Colleges of Pharmacy (AACP); it is offered in January, July, and September. The test is divided into five sections to be taken in approximately three and a half hours.  The test includes Writing, Biology, Chemistry, Critical reading, and Quantitative Reasoning sections. The composite score is based on the multiple-choice sections, and can range from 200 – 600. There is no passing score; pharmacy schools set their own standards for acceptable scores. Calculators are not allowed during the testing period and no penalty is given for incorrect answers.

See also
 List of admissions tests
 American Association of Colleges of Pharmacy

External links

Official PCAT website
About the PCAT

References

Pharmacy education
Professional examinations in healthcare
Standardized tests in the United States
English language tests